The Sheffield & Hallamshire Minor Cup was a county cup competition organised by the Sheffield & Hallamshire County Football Association from 1882 to 1896.

Finals

See also
 Sheffield & Hallamshire County Cup
 Sheffield & Hallamshire County Senior League
 Sheffield & Hallamshire Senior Cup
 Sheffield & Hallamshire Association Cup
 Sheffield & Hallamshire Junior Cup

References

Sport in Sheffield
Defunct football competitions in South Yorkshire
County Cup competitions